Peter Heyl Hassrick (April 27, 1941 – October 25, 2019) was an American museum curator, art historian, and the author or editor of many exhibition catalogues about Western American art.

Early life
Hassrick was born on April 27, 1941 in Philadelphia, Pennsylvania, USA. He graduated from the Steamboat Mountain School, the University of Colorado Boulder, where he earned a bachelor's degree in History, and the University of Denver, where he earned a master's degree in Art History.

Career
Hassrick was the curator of the Amon Carter Museum of American Art in Fort Worth, Texas and the Buffalo Bill Center of the West in Cody, Wyoming, the founding director of the Georgia O'Keeffe Museum in Santa Fe, New Mexico and the Charles Russell Center for the Study of Western American Art at the University of Oklahoma in Norman, Oklahoma, and the founder of the Petrie Institute of American Western Art at the Denver Art Museum. He authored and edited many exhibitions catalogues about the art of the Western United States.

Hassrick served on the board of directors of the Cody Regional Health Foundation, the Wyoming Arts Council and the Wyoming Humanities Council. He received an honorary PhD from the University of Wyoming. For the Cody Enterprise, Hassrick was "a titan of Western American art."

Personal life and death
Hassrick married Elizabeth Drake, also known as Buzzy, and they had two sons. He died of cancer on October 25, 2019 in Cody, Wyoming.

Selected works

References

1941 births
2019 deaths
Writers from Philadelphia
People from Cody, Wyoming
University of Colorado Boulder alumni
University of Denver alumni
American art curators
American art historians
Deaths from cancer in Wyoming